The Simpsons is an arcade beat 'em up developed and published by Konami released in 1991. It was the first video game based on the Simpsons franchise to be released in North America. The game allows up to four players to control members of the Simpson family as they fight various enemies to rescue the kidnapped Maggie. It was a commercial success in the United States, where it was one of the top three best-selling arcade video game machines of 1991, The game also features the television shows's voice actors; Dan Castellaneta, Julie Kavner, Nancy Cartwright and Yeardley Smith reprising their respective roles as the Simpsons Family.

The game was ported to the Commodore 64 and MS-DOS soon after its launch in the arcades, and was released as The Simpsons Arcade Game on those platforms. It was also released under that title on Xbox Live Arcade for Xbox 360 and PlayStation Network for PlayStation 3 in February 2012, however it has since been removed from both services on December 20, 2013. In 2021, Arcade1Up released a 30th anniversary edition home arcade cabinet.

Plot 

While walking through downtown Springfield, the Simpsons collide with Smithers, who has just stolen a large diamond from a jewelry shop for Mr. Burns. The diamond goes flying and lands in Maggie's mouth, and she begins sucking on it like a pacifier as Smithers kidnaps her. The rest of the Simpsons give chase across the city, fighting off hordes of enemies (hired by Mr. Burns) to reach the Springfield Nuclear Power Plant. The pursuit covers eight stages, each of which ends with a fight against a strong boss character. In the final stage, the Simpsons must defeat first Smithers and then Mr. Burns, who uses a mobile battle suit equipped with a variety of weapons. Once Mr. Burns is defeated, Maggie puts her pacifier in his mouth and the Simpsons take her home, with Homer throwing the diamond away.

Gameplay 

The Simpsons is a side-scrolling beat 'em up that allows players to join in at any time. Two different cabinet models were produced: one allowing up to two simultaneous players, each able to choose a character, and another allowing four players with a dedicated position for each character. Controls consist of an eight-way joystick and two buttons to jump and attack.

The characters have distinctive attack styles; Homer punches and kicks, Marge swings a vacuum cleaner, Bart wields a skateboard, and Lisa attacks with a jump rope. Two characters standing close to each other can mount a combined attack, such as Homer and Marge holding each other's ankles to roll around the screen and mow down enemies, or Homer placing Lisa on his shoulders so they can strike at two different heights. Each player has a health meter, which decreases upon being hit by enemies; food items can be picked up to replenish it. Players can also pick up and throw/swing items such as hammers, bowling balls, and mailboxes as melee weapons. One life is lost whenever a player's health meter runs out; if all lives are lost, the player may continue the game by adding credits within a time limit. Two minigames played between stages require players to hit their buttons as quickly as possible, with computer-controlled enemies replacing any characters not in play.

The Japanese version of the game includes many differences from the North American release. These changes include throwable small scale nuclear bombs that clear all on-screen enemies. A life bar that, unlike in the North American version, can accumulate three levels by eating food beyond the first full level. The player's life is turned into bonus points after they complete a level and is restored when the next level begins. In this version there are hidden items (food and weapons) which appear when the player hits specific points of the screen. Also, in the Japanese version the score system is different: each enemy character defeated gives the player a certain number of points, while at the North American version the player only earns a single point by defeating them. This is similar to the Teenage Mutant Ninja Turtles arcade game score system.

Legacy
Soon after the Simpsons' arcade release, Novotrade released ports for Commodore 64 and MS-DOS computers. A listing on the Australian Classification Board website, posted on November 9, 2011, hinted at a port of the game being developed by Backbone Entertainment for multiple platforms. In January 2012, a high-definition port of The Simpsons Arcade Game was announced for PlayStation Network for release in February, with a release on Xbox Live Arcade also revealed. The port features online multiplayer, the ability to unlock the rare Japanese 4-player version of the game, and promotional content from the game's arcade launch. The game was initially made available exclusively to PlayStation Plus users at no charge. In December 2013, the game was removed from the PlayStation Network store, although at the time it was still available through the Xbox Live Marketplace; no reason for the removal was given by either Sony or Konami.

A completely different title inspired by the arcade game, The Simpsons Arcade, was released by Electronic Arts for iOS on December 19, 2009. Unlike the arcade game, the title is a single player game where players control Homer, assisted by the other family members via power-ups. The plot is also slightly altered, as it revolves around a thumb drive containing plans for Burns' "Project: Operation Mission" hidden inside a donut that Homer attempted to eat after bumping into Smithers, who had been tasked with securing the plans. With Burns' associates retrieving the donut and taking turns keeping it safe while Homer remains ignorant of the drive inside, his objective is simply to take back the donut.

In June 2021, Arcade1Up announced its intent to release a 30th anniversary edition home arcade cabinet in late fall the same year.

Reception 

In the United States, thousands of arcade cabinets were ordered upon its debut at the American Coin Machine Exposition (ACME) in March 1991. The Simpsons went on to win a Platinum award from the American Amusement Machine Association (AAMA) for sales achievement in 1991, making it one of the top three best-selling arcade video game machines of 1991 (with the Neo Geo MVS which won Platinum and below Street Fighter II which won Diamond). In Japan, Game Machine listed The Simpsons on their October 1, 1991 issue as being the eleventh most-popular arcade game for the previous two weeks.

The arcade game received positive reviews from critics. Sinclair User gave it a positive review, saying “It’s the great looking graphics, good sampled sound and clever animations that makes the Simpsons such fun to play“ ScrewAttack ranked the arcade game as the best cartoon-based game.

The PC/MS-DOS version of the game was reviewed in 1992 in Dragon #180 by Hartley, Patricia, and Kirk Lesser in "The Role of Computers" column. The reviewers gave the game 3 out of 5 stars.

References

External links 

1991 video games
Appaloosa Interactive games
Arcade video games
Commodore 64 games
Cooperative video games
DOS games
IOS games
IOS-only games
Konami beat 'em ups
PlayStation Network games
Arcade Game
Video games featuring female protagonists
Video games set in the United States
Video games with oblique graphics
Xbox 360 Live Arcade games
Delisted digital-only games
Multiplayer and single-player video games
Side-scrolling beat 'em ups
Video games developed in Japan